The 1975–76 Iowa Hawkeyes men's basketball team represented the University of Iowa as members of the Big Ten Conference. The team was led by head coach Lute Olson, coaching in his 2nd season at the school, and played their home games at the Iowa Field House. They finished the season 19–10 overall and 9–9 in Big Ten play.

Roster

Schedule/results

|-
!colspan=8| Non-Conference Regular Season
|-

|-
!colspan=8| Big Ten Conference Season
|-

Rankings

References

Iowa
Iowa Hawkeyes men's basketball seasons
Hawkeyes
Hawkeyes